The Sørensen formol titration(SFT) invented by S. P. L. Sørensen in 1907  is a titration of an amino acid with potassium hydroxide in the presence of formaldehyde. It is used in the determination of protein content in samples.

If instead of an amino acid an ammonium salt is used the reaction product with formaldehyde is hexamethylenetetramine:

The liberated hydrochloric acid is then titrated with the base and the amount of ammonium salt used can be determined.

With an amino acid the formaldehyde reacts with the amino group to form a methylene amino (R-N=CH2) group. The remaining acidic carboxylic acid group can then again be titrated with base.

In winemaking
Formol titration is one of the methods used in winemaking to measure yeast assimilable nitrogen needed by wine yeast in order to successfully complete fermentation.

Accuracy in formol titration 
There has been some inaccuracies of the SFT caused by the differences in the basicity of the nitrogen in different amino acids which were explained by S. L. Jodidi. For instances, proline(an amino acid), histidine, and lysine yields too low values compared to the theory. Unlike alpha, monobasic (containing one amino group per molecule) amino acids, these amino (or imino) acids' nitrogens have inconstant basicity, which results in partial reaction with formaldehyde.

In case of tyrosine, the actual results are too high due to the negative hydroxyl group (-OH), which acts as a base. This explanation is supported by the fact that phenylalanine can be accurately titrated.

References

Biochemistry methods
Titration